Enrico Pagani (7 September 1929 – 2 October 1998) was an Italian basketball player. He competed in the men's tournament at the 1952 Summer Olympics.

References

1929 births
1998 deaths
Italian men's basketball players
Olympic basketball players of Italy
Basketball players at the 1952 Summer Olympics
Basketball players from Shanghai